Flint House is a domestic dwelling on the Waddesdon Estate, Buckinghamshire, England. It was commissioned by Jacob Rothschild, 4th Baron Rothschild, and completed in 2015, winning that year's RIBA House of the Year Award. The architect was Charlotte Skene Catling, a partner of Skene Catling de la Peña. The stones for the exterior were hand-knapped by master flint knappers John Lord and Simon Williams in Norfolk. The interiors were decorated and furnished by David Mlinaric, using an eclectic mix of modern contemporary pieces and older items from the Rothschild collection. The ethos of the house is that it blends and harmonises with the surrounding landscape and environment.

The site chosen for the house, is an isolated spot at the heart of the Waddesdon estate in open countryside surrounded by grass pastures and arable fields. It can be accessed only by a narrow unmetalled track. While it is only a few hundred metres from its nearest neighbours, the new Rothschild Archive building and a farm cottage, a fold in the landscape prevents the sight of buildings from the house and enhances its senses of isolation and being in nature.

Its architect has described the house as "jutting from the ground like a collision of tectonic plates".

The house was given to the Rothschild Foundation, and is used to accommodate visitors including academics and artists working on projects at Waddesdon Manor, and the Rothschild Getty Fellow when at Waddesdon.  It can be visited by arrangement at certain times.

Architecture

During initial surveys of the site, it was discovered that it sat directly above the seam of chalk which runs from Kent to Norfolk; this inspired the architect to use flint (a sediment of chalk) and limestone as the principal building materials. Despite an abundance of the stone lying naturally on the Waddesdon estate, it was decided to use stone sourced from quarries in Norfolk. The knapped flints were graded into six almost imperceptible shades to create bands of colour in the walls, changing from the darkest flint at ground level to the lightest chalk at roof level. This seemingly naturally occurring colour scheme of stone creates an artful illusion of the building blending into the frequently grey skyscape against which it stands. The flints were hand-knapped by master flint knapper John Lord, who used an ancient technique used to craft square section hand axes, originating in prehistoric Denmark.

The long rectangular structure is designed with an unusual stepped roof which rises from the ground to the building's full height, creating wedge-shaped side elevations. The plan is long and thin, in places only one room wide. The building's triangular shape also resembles a flint.

The house's interior contains an open-plan ground floor with the kitchen at the centre of what is almost an enfilade, which includes a dining room, small sitting room, and a drawing room, beyond which is a study. The study was inspired by the Baron's Room at nearby Waddesdon Manor, where the private study of Baron Ferdinand de Rothschild contains a small spiral staircase leading to his bedroom directly above; at the Flint House, the study too contains a steep spiral staircase leading directly to the principal bedroom. The upper floor also contains two further bedrooms. Each of the three bedrooms has a small adjoining bathroom with a sunken bath, and its own private roof terrace almost hidden in the stepped roof.

Throughout the design, the elements of water, air and fire have been used to create an animation to the plan and reinforce the sense of nature: Air is created by the use of double height spaces and abundance of large windows which not only light the house, but bring the landscape within. Water is used to create a sense of fluidity and reflection: A small stream running near the house, has been diverted to run through and around the building before flowing to a nearby pool. The stream has been further enhance by small dams which limit and adjust the flow of water, from an imperceptibly slow flowing rill to a more agitated, fast flowing stream. In one recessed corner of the house, the stream forms a pool around which a glazed flint grotto, illuminated by small led lights, has been designed. While inside the house the water is visible through a glass floor which seems to create a bridge from the drawing room. Fire is reflected through a glass panel at the rear of the drawing room fireplace into the pool of the grotto at its rear.

The house has a small annex designed in the same style, detached from the main house but linked to it through an architectural scheme that presents a visual avenue flowing from the top of the stepped roof down the ground, then transforming into a rising stepped grass path leading to the annex. The annex itself is a smaller version of the main house intended for staff or guests.

Grounds

The house rises directly from a planned but seemingly natural tangled wilderness of indigenous grasses and wild flowers. The roof's stepped design incorporates small rectangular pockets designed to be easily colonised by indigenous plants seeding naturally on the wind; this, in time, combined with the naturally occurring mosses and, in time, weather-worn stone steps of the roof, will further permit the building to blend into and be absorbed by the landscape.

Awards
In 2015, Flint House won the RIBA House of the Year Award.

Public access

The Flint House is open to visitors at certain times or for group visits.

References 

Country houses in Buckinghamshire
Residential buildings completed in 2015
Waddesdon Manor